The 2016 United States Senate election in Oklahoma was held November 8, 2016 to elect a member of the United States Senate to represent the State of Oklahoma, concurrently with the 2016 U.S. presidential election, as well as other elections to the United States Senate in other states and elections to the United States House of Representatives and various state and local elections. The primaries were held June 28.

Incumbent Republican Senator James Lankford won re-election to a first full term in office, by a landslide margin of 43%, sweeping every county statewide in the Republican stronghold.

Republican primary

Candidates

Declared 
 James Lankford, incumbent Senator

Democratic primary

Candidates

Declared 
 Mike Workman, political consultant and nominee for Labor Commissioner in 2014

Withdrew 
 Steve Perry, attorney and nominee for OK-05 in 2008

Declined 
 Dan Boren, former U.S. Representative
 Joe Dorman, former State Representative, and nominee for Governor in 2014
 Brad Henry, former Governor of Oklahoma
 Constance N. Johnson, former State Senator and nominee for the U.S. Senate in 2014

Libertarian primary

Candidates

Declared 
 Dax Ewbank, Republican candidate for Governor in 2014
 Robert Murphy, independent candidate for OK-05 in 2014

Results

General election

Predictions

Polling

Results

References

External links 
Official campaign websites
 James Lankford (R) for Senate
 Mike Workman (D) for Senate
 Dax Ewbank (L) for Senate

2016
Oklahoma (U.S. state)
United States Senate